Albrecht "Ali" Höhler (April 30, 1898 – September 20, 1933) was a German communist. He was a member of the Red Front Fighters Association (Roter Frontkämpferbund or RFB), the street-fighters of the Communist Party of Germany. He is known for the killing of Horst Wessel, a local leader in Berlin of the Nazi Party's SA stormtroopers. After the Nazis came to power, Höhler was taken out of prison and executed by the SA. The triggerman was former Imperial German Prince August Wilhelm of Prussia.

Early life 
Born in Mainz, Höhler was a carpenter and a member of the Communist Party of Germany (KPD) in 1924. He was also a member of the Red Front Fighter Association and continued to be active in the RFB after its prohibition in 1929. By 1930, he was residing in the Mitte borough of Berlin.

Killing of Horst Wessel 
The Red Front Fighter Alliance was alerted about a rental dispute between the communist affiliated landlord Elisabeth Salm and her tenant Horst Wessel on January 14, 1930. According to information revealed in court, the notorious SA man was targeted for a "proletarian beating". This action was most likely politically motivated; Horst Wessel was called out as the "murderer of workers" in neighborhood posters put up by the Communist Party. Wessel was involved in numerous violent actions against communists in Berlin and was well known to Nazi Party Gauleiter (regional leader) Joseph Goebbels. Since it was known that Wessel had a firearm, Höhler took his gun in the RFB-led confrontation with Wessel. Höhler later stated in court that he shot Wessel as he reached for his pocket. The seriously injured Wessel died on February 23, 1930, as a result of the gunshot wound.

Imprisonment and assassination 
Höhler first fled to Prague, but then returned to Berlin, where he was arrested.

On September 26, 1930, Höhler was convicted of manslaughter and sentenced to six years and one month imprisonment at Wohlau Prison. After the seizure of power by the Nazi Party, Höhler was transferred to a Gestapo prison in Berlin, allegedly to interrogate him about a retrial. He demanded to be returned to Wohlau.

On September 20, 1933, Höhler was taken on the orders of SA-Gruppenführer Karl Ernst by three detectives, including SA member Willi Schmidt. He was transferred from the police prison at Alexanderplatz on the basis of a Gestapo signed delivery order. Near Potsdamer Platz, several more vehicles approached the prisoner van. The vehicle column drove towards Frankfurt on the Oder. About 12 km from Frankfurt, the column stopped. Höhler was ordered to leave the transport and was led by a group of at least eight people away from the road to a nearby forest. There, Gruppenführer Ernst gave a short speech, in which he condemned Höhler to death as the murderer of Horst Wessel. Höhler was then shot by several of those present near the Berlin-Frankfurt Chaussee. The body was barely buried on the spot.

Later investigation 
In 1933, the investigation into Höhler's murder was aborted due to political pressure. The official police report to the prosecutor allegedly stated that the transport had been intercepted on the street by a group of seven to eight SA men and that the officers had been forced to surrender Höhler under threat of violence, who had then been abducted with an unknown destination.

When the investigation was reopened by the Berlin prosecutor's office in the 1960s, the true course of events was discovered by interrogating Willi Schmidt and Kurt Wendt (the chauffeur of Karl Ernst). At that time, Höhler's murderers were identified as Gruppenführer Prince August Wilhelm of Prussia, Gestapo chief Rudolf Diels (who concealed the facts in his memoirs), Karl Ernst, his adjutant Walter von Mohrenschildt, the SA-Standartenführer Richard Fiedler, the Sturmbannführer Willi Markus, the detectives Maikowski and Walter Pohlenz and possibly Gerd Voss, the legal adviser of the SA group in Berlin-Brandenburg. The fatal shots were likely made by Ernst and Mohrenschildt, according to the findings of the prosecutor. Ernst was said to have organized the murder on the orders of Ernst Röhm, who had in turn received orders from Adolf Hitler that the killer of Wessel be summarily shot.

Less than a year after executing Höhler, Ernst, Mohrenschildt, Voss, and Röhm were all executed themselves during the Night of the Long Knives. Prince Wilhelm was interned by the U.S. Army after the war. He was sentenced to two years in prison by a denazification court in 1948, and died in 1949. Diels was interned by the Allies until 1948, and died after his rifle accidentally discharged while he was hunting in 1957.

The investigation of the surviving perpetrators: Schmidt, Pohlenz, Markus, and Fiedler, was finally discontinued in 1969, as the prosecutors could only prove aiding and abetting the murder, for which the statute of limitations had already passed.

References

External links 
 Daniel Siemens: Infamer Mord an einem Mörder. einestages; über die Ermordung Albrecht Höhlers
 Daniel Siemens: Höhler, Albrecht et al., in: Kurt Groenewold, Alexander Ignor, Arnd Koch (Hrsg.): Lexikon der Politischen Strafprozesse, Online, Stand Mai 2016

1898 births
1933 deaths
German assassins
Manslaughter in Germany
Politicians from Mainz
German Communist Party members
German anti-fascists
German murder victims
German people convicted of manslaughter
Executed communists
German people executed by Nazi Germany
People executed by Nazi Germany by firearm
People murdered in Germany
Horst Wessel
Extrajudicial killings